Stigmella is a genus of moths of the family Nepticulidae. The genus was erected by Franz von Paula Schrank in 1802.

Species found in Africa

Stigmella abachausi (Janse, 1948)
Stigmella abutilonica Scoble, 1978
Stigmella allophylica Scoble, 1978
Stigmella allophylivora Gustafsson, 1985
Stigmella ampullata Scoble, 1978
Stigmella androflava Scoble, 1978
Stigmella angustivalva Scoble, 1978
Stigmella caliginosa (Meyrick, 1921)
Stigmella celtifoliella Vari, 1955
Stigmella charistis Vari, 1963
Stigmella confinalis Scoble, 1978
Stigmella crotonica Scoble, 1978
Stigmella dombeyivora Scoble, 1978
Stigmella ficivora Gustafsson, 1985
Stigmella fluida (Meyrick, 1911)
Stigmella galactacma (Meyrick, 1924)
Stigmella generalis Scoble, 1978
Stigmella geranica Scoble, 1978
Stigmella grewiae Scoble, 1978
Stigmella gustafssoni (Capuse, 1975)
Stigmella hortorum Scoble, 1978
Stigmella ingens (Meyrick, 1913)
Stigmella irrorata (Janse, 1948)
Stigmella krugeri Vari, 1963
Stigmella letabensis Scoble, 1978
Stigmella liota Vari, 1963
Stigmella mandingella (Gustafsson, 1972)
Stigmella maytenivora Gustafsson, 1985
Stigmella naibabi Mey, 2004
Stigmella nigrata (Meyrick, 1913)
Stigmella panconista (Meyrick, 1920)
Stigmella parinarella Vari, 1955
Stigmella perplexa (Janse, 1948)
Stigmella platyzona Vari, 1963
Stigmella porphyreuta (Meyrick, 1917)
Stigmella potgieteri Scoble, 1978
Stigmella pretoriata Scoble, 1978
Stigmella protosema (Meyrick, 1921)
Stigmella rhomboivora Gustafsson, 1985
Stigmella rhynchosiella Vari, 1955
Stigmella satarensis Scoble, 1978
Stigmella tragilis Scoble, 1978
Stigmella triumfettica Scoble, 1978
Stigmella tropicatella Legrand, 1965
Stigmella urbica (Meyrick, 1913)
Stigmella uwusebi Mey, 2004
Stigmella varii Scoble, 1978
Stigmella wollofella (Gustafsson, 1972)
Stigmella worcesteri Scoble, 1983
Stigmella xuthomitra (Meyrick, 1921)

Species found in the Palearctic ecozone
The following species are found in Europe:

Stigmella aceris (Frey, 1857)
Stigmella aeneofasciella (Herrich-Schäffer, 1855)
Stigmella alaternella (Le Marchand, 1937)
Stigmella alnetella (Stainton, 1856)
Stigmella amygdali (Klimesch, 1978)
Stigmella anomalella (Goeze, 1783)
Stigmella assimilella (Zeller, 1848)
Stigmella atricapitella (Haworth, 1828)
Stigmella aurella (Fabricius, 1775)
Stigmella auromarginella (Richardson, 1890)
Stigmella aurora Puplesis, 1984
Stigmella azaroli (Klimesch, 1978)
Stigmella basiguttella (Heinemann, 1862)
Stigmella benanderella (Wolff, 1955)
Stigmella betulicola (Stainton, 1856)
Stigmella carpinella (Heinemann, 1862)
Stigmella catharticella (Stainton, 1853)
Stigmella centifoliella (Zeller, 1848)
Stigmella cocciferae van Nieukerken & Johansson, 2003
Stigmella confusella (Wood & Walsingham, 1894)
Stigmella continuella (Stainton, 1856)
Stigmella crataegella (Klimesch, 1936)
Stigmella crenulatae (Klimesch, 1975)
Stigmella desperatella (Frey, 1856)
Stigmella diniensis (Klimesch, 1975)
Stigmella dorsiguttella (Johansson, 1971)
Stigmella dryadella (O. Hofmann, 1868)
Stigmella eberhardi (Johansson, 1971)
Stigmella fasciata van Nieukerken & Johansson, 2003
Stigmella filipendulae (Wocke, 1871)
Stigmella floslactella (Haworth, 1828)
Stigmella freyella (Heyden, 1858)
Stigmella geimontani (Klimesch, 1940)
Stigmella glutinosae (Stainton, 1858)
Stigmella hahniella (Wortz, 1890)
Stigmella hemargyrella (Kollar, 1832)
Stigmella hybnerella (Hübner, 1796)
Stigmella ilicifoliella (Mendes, 1918)
Stigmella incognitella (Herrich-Schäffer, 1855)
Stigmella inopinata A. & Z. Lastuvka, 1991
Stigmella irregularis Puplesis, 1994
Stigmella johanssonella A. & Z. Lastuvka, 1997
Stigmella kazakhstanica Puplesis, 1991
Stigmella lapponica (Wocke, 1862)
Stigmella lediella (Schleich, 1867)
Stigmella lemniscella (Zeller, 1839)
Stigmella lonicerarum (Frey, 1856)
Stigmella luteella (Stainton, 1857)
Stigmella macrolepidella (Klimesch, 1978)
Stigmella magdalenae (Klimesch, 1950)
Stigmella malella (Stainton, 1854)
Stigmella mespilicola (Frey, 1856)
Stigmella microtheriella (Stainton, 1854)
Stigmella minusculella (Herrich-Schäffer, 1855)
Stigmella muricatella (Klimesch, 1978)
Stigmella myrtillella (Stainton, 1857)
Stigmella naturnella (Klimesch, 1936)
Stigmella nivenburgensis (Preissecker, 1942)
Stigmella nylandriella (Tengstrom, 1848)
Stigmella obliquella (Heinemann, 1862)
Stigmella oxyacanthella (Stainton, 1854)
Stigmella paliurella Gerasimov, 1937
Stigmella pallidiciliella Klimesch, 1946
Stigmella paradoxa (Frey, 1858)
Stigmella perpygmaeella (Doubleday, 1859)
Stigmella plagicolella (Stainton, 1854)
Stigmella poterii (Stainton, 1857)
Stigmella pretiosa (Heinemann, 1862)
Stigmella prunetorum (Stainton, 1855)
Stigmella pyrellicola (Klimesch, 1978)
Stigmella pyri (Glitz, 1865)
Stigmella pyrivora Gustafsson, 1981
Stigmella regiella (Herrich-Schäffer, 1855)
Stigmella rhamnella (Herrich-Schäffer, 1860)
Stigmella rhamnophila (Amsel, 1934)
Stigmella roborella (Johansson, 1971)
Stigmella rolandi van Nieukerken, 1990
Stigmella ruficapitella (Haworth, 1828)
Stigmella sakhalinella Puplesis, 1984
Stigmella salicis (Stainton, 1854)
Stigmella samiatella (Zeller, 1839)
Stigmella sanguisorbae (Wocke, 1865)
Stigmella sorbi (Stainton, 1861)
Stigmella speciosa (Frey, 1857)
Stigmella spinosissimae (Waters, 1928)
Stigmella splendidissimella (Herrich-Schäffer, 1855)
Stigmella stelviana (Weber, 1938)
Stigmella stettinensis (Heinemann, 1871)
Stigmella styracicolella (Klimesch, 1978)
Stigmella suberivora (Stainton, 1869)
Stigmella svenssoni (Johansson, 1971)
Stigmella szoecsiella (Borkowski, 1972)
Stigmella thuringiaca (Petry, 1904)
Stigmella tiliae (Frey, 1856)
Stigmella tityrella (Stainton, 1854)
Stigmella tormentillella (Herrich-Schäffer, 1860)
Stigmella torminalis (Wood, 1890)
Stigmella trimaculella (Haworth, 1828)
Stigmella tristis (Wocke, 1862)
Stigmella trojana Z. & A. Lastuvka, 1998
Stigmella ulmiphaga (Preissecker, 1942)
Stigmella ulmivora (Fologne, 1860)
Stigmella vimineticola (Frey, 1856)
Stigmella viscerella (Stainton, 1853)
Stigmella xystodes (Meyrick, 1916)
Stigmella zangherii (Klimesch, 1951)
Stigmella zelleriella (Snellen, 1875)

The following species are found in the Palearctic ecozone, but not in Europe:

Stigmella abaiella Klimesch, 1979
Stigmella acerna Puplesis, 1988
Stigmella acrochaetia Kemperman & Wilkinson, 1985
Stigmella aflatuniae Puplesis & Diškus, 1996
Stigmella aiderensis Puplesis, 1988
Stigmella aladina Puplesis, 1984
Stigmella alaurulenta Kemperman & Wilkinson, 1985
Stigmella alikurokoi Kemperman & Wilkinson, 1985
Stigmella alisa Puplesis, 1985
Stigmella amuriella Puplesis, 1985
Stigmella arbatella (Chrétien, 1922)
Stigmella armeniana Puplesis, 1994
Stigmella attenuata Puplesis, 1985
Stigmella auricularia Puplesis, Diškus & Juchnevic, 2003
Stigmella azuminoensis Hirano, 2010
Stigmella azusa Hirano, 2010
Stigmella betulifoliae Puplesis & Diškus, 2003
Stigmella bicolor Puplesis, 1988
Stigmella bicuspidata van Nieukerken & Johansson, 2003
Stigmella birgittae Gustafsson, 1985
Stigmella boehmeriae Kemperman & Wilkinson, 1985
Stigmella bumbegerensis Puplesis, 1984
Stigmella caesurifasciella Kemperman & Wilkinson, 1985
Stigmella caspica Puplesis, 1994
Stigmella castanopsiella (Kuroko, 1978)
Stigmella cathepostis Kemperman & Wilkinson, 1985
Stigmella cerasi Puplesis & Diškus, 1996
Stigmella chaenomelae Kemperman & Wilkinson, 1985
Stigmella circumargentea van Nieukerken & Y.Q. Liu, 2000
Stigmella clisiotophora Kemperman & Wilkinson, 1985
Stigmella conchyliata Kemperman & Wilkinson, 1985
Stigmella crataegi Gerasimov, 1937
Stigmella crataegivora Puplesis, 1985
Stigmella crenatiella Hirano, 2010
Stigmella dentatae Puplesis, 1984
Stigmella dissona (Puplesis, 1984)
Stigmella divina Puplesis, Diškus & van Nieukerken, 1997
Stigmella egonokii Kemperman & Wilkinson, 1985
Stigmella excelsa Puplesis & Diškus, 2003
Stigmella fasciola Puplesis & Diškus, 2003
Stigmella fervida Puplesis, 1984
Stigmella ficulnea Puplesis & Krasilnikova, 1994
Stigmella flavescens Puplesis, 1994
Stigmella fumida Kemperman & Wilkinson, 1985
Stigmella fuscacalyptriella Puplesis, 1994
Stigmella georgiana Puplesis, 1994
Stigmella gimmonella (Matsumura, 1931)
Stigmella grandistyla Puplesis, 1994
Stigmella gutlebiella Laštuvka & Huemer, 2002
Stigmella hisakoae Hirano, 2010
Stigmella hisaii Kuroko, 2004
Stigmella hissariella Puplesis, 1994
Stigmella honshui Kemperman & Wilkinson, 1985
Stigmella ichigoiella Kemperman & Wilkinson, 1985
Stigmella johanssoni Puplesis & Diškus, 1996
Stigmella juratae Puplesis, 1988
Stigmella kao van Nieukerken & Y.Q. Liu, 2000
Stigmella karsholti van Nieukerken & Johansson, 2003
Stigmella kasyi van Nieukerken & Johansson, 2003
Stigmella klimeschi Puplesis, 1988
Stigmella kondarai Puplesis, 1988
Stigmella kopetdagica Puplesis, 1994
Stigmella kozlovi Puplesis, 1984
Stigmella kurilensis Puplesis, 1987
Stigmella kurokoi Puplesis, 1984
Stigmella kurotsubarai Kemperman & Wilkinson, 1985
Stigmella kuznetzovi Puplesis, 1994
Stigmella lanceolata Puplesis, 1994
Stigmella lithocarpella van Nieukerken & Liu, 2000
Stigmella longispina Puplesis, 1994
Stigmella lurida Puplesis, 1994
Stigmella malifoliella Puplesis, 1991
Stigmella maloidica Puplesis, 1991
Stigmella micromelis Puplesis, 1985
Stigmella mirabella (Puplesis, 1984)
Stigmella monella Puplesis, 1984
Stigmella montana Puplesis, 1991
Stigmella monticulella Puplesis, 1984
Stigmella morivora Hirano, 2010
Stigmella motiekaitisi Puplesis, 1994
Stigmella nakamurai Kemperman & Wilkinson, 1985
Stigmella nireae Kemperman & Wilkinson, 1985
Stigmella nostrata Puplesis, 1984
Stigmella oa Kemperman & Wilkinson, 1985
Stigmella omelkoi Puplesis, 1984
Stigmella oplismeniella Kemperman & Wilkinson, 1985
Stigmella orientalis Kemperman & Wilkinson, 1985
Stigmella palionisi Puplesis, 1984
Stigmella palmatae Puplesis, 1984
Stigmella pamirbetulae Puplesis & Diškus, 2003
Stigmella polymorpha Puplesis & Diškus, 2003
Stigmella populnea Kemperman & Wilkinson, 1985
Stigmella sashai Puplesis, 1984
Stigmella semiaurea Puplesis, 1988
Stigmella sesplicata Kemperman & Wilkinson, 1985
Stigmella sorbivora Kemperman & Wilkinson, 1985
Stigmella spiculifera Kemperman & Wilkinson, 1985
Stigmella subsorbi Puplesis, 1994
Stigmella taigae Puplesis, 1984
Stigmella talassica Puplesis, 1992
Stigmella tegmentosella Puplesis, 1984
Stigmella titivillitia Kemperman & Wilkinson, 1985
Stigmella tranocrossa Kemperman & Wilkinson, 1985
Stigmella trifasciata (Matsumura, 1931)
Stigmella trisyllaba Puplesis, 1992
Stigmella turbatrix Puplesis, 1994
Stigmella ultima Puplesis, 1984
Stigmella vandrieli van Nieukerken & Liu, 2000
Stigmella vittata Kemperman & Wilkinson, 1985
Stigmella zagulaevi Puplesis, 1994
Stigmella zelkoviella Kemperman & Wilkinson, 1985
Stigmella zizyphi (Walsingham, 1911)
Stigmella zumii Kemperman & Wilkinson, 1985

Species found in the Indo-Malayan ecozone

Stigmella aeriventris (Meyrick, 1932)
Stigmella alicia (Meyrick, 1928)
Stigmella argyrodoxa (Meyrick, 1918)
Stigmella auxozona (Meyrick, 1934)
Stigmella ebbenielseni van Nieukerken & van den Berg, 2003
Stigmella elachistarcha (Meyrick, 1934)
Stigmella elegantiae Puplesis & Diškus, 2003
Stigmella fibigeri Puplesis & Diškus, 2003
Stigmella himalayai Puplesis & Diškus, 2003
Stigmella hoplometalla (Meyrick, 1934)
Stigmella ipomoeella (Gustafsson, 1976)
Stigmella isochalca (Meyrick, 1916)
Stigmella longicornuta Puplesis & Diškus, 2003
Stigmella maculifera Puplesis & Diškus, 2003
Stigmella neodora (Meyrick, 1918)
Stigmella nepali Puplesis & Diškus, 2003
Stigmella oligosperma (Meyrick, 1934)
Stigmella oritis (Meyrick, 1910)
Stigmella polydoxa (Meyrick, 1911)
Stigmella skulei Puplesis & Diškus, 2003
Stigmella sruogai Puplesis & Diškus, 2003
Stigmella tenebrica Puplesis & Diškus, 2003

Species found in Australia and New Zealand
The following species are found in Australia:
Stigmella leucargyra (Meyrick, 1906)
Stigmella phyllanthina (Meyrick, 1906)
Stigmella symmora (Meyrick, 1906)

The following species are found in New Zealand:

Stigmella aigialeia Donner & Wilkinson, 1989
Stigmella aliena Donner & Wilkinson, 1989
Stigmella atrata Donner & Wilkinson, 1989
Stigmella cassiniae Donner & Wilkinson, 1989
Stigmella childi Donner & Wilkinson, 1989
Stigmella cypracma (Meyrick, 1916)
Stigmella erysibodea Donner & Wilkinson, 1989
Stigmella fulva (Watt, 1921)
Stigmella hakekeae Donner & Wilkinson, 1989
Stigmella hamishella Donner & Wilkinson, 1989
Stigmella hoheriae Donner & Wilkinson, 1989
Stigmella ilsea Donner & Wilkinson, 1989
Stigmella insignis (Philpott, 1927)
Stigmella kaimanua Donner & Wilkinson, 1989
Stigmella laqueorum (Dugdale, 1971)
Stigmella lucida (Philpott, 1919)
Stigmella maoriella (Walker, 1864)
Stigmella ogygia (Meyrick, 1889)
Stigmella oriastra (Meyrick, 1917)
Stigmella palaga Donner & Wilkinson, 1989
Stigmella platina Donner & Wilkinson, 1989
Stigmella progama (Meyrick, 1924)
Stigmella progonopis (Meyrick, 1921)
Stigmella propalaea (Meyrick, 1889)
Stigmella sophorae (Hudson, 1939)
Stigmella tricentra (Meyrick, 1889)
Stigmella watti Donner & Wilkinson, 1989

Species found in North and South America
The following species are found in North America:

Stigmella alba Wilkinson & Scoble, 1979
Stigmella altella (Braun, 1914)
Stigmella amelanchierella (Clemens, 1862)
Stigmella apicialbella (Chambers, 1873)
Stigmella argentifasciella (Braun, 1912)
Stigmella aromella Wilkinson & Scoble, 1979
Stigmella belfrageella (Chambers, 1875)
Stigmella braunella (W. W. Jones, 1933)
Stigmella castaneaefoliella (Chambers, 1875)
Stigmella ceanothi (Braun, 1910)
Stigmella cerea (Braun, 1917)
Stigmella condaliafoliella (Busck, 1900)
Stigmella corylifoliella (Clemens, 1861)
Stigmella crataegifoliella (Clemens, 1861)
Stigmella diffasciae (Braun, 1910)
Stigmella flavipedella (Braun, 1914)
Stigmella fuscotibiella (Clemens, 1862)
Stigmella gossypii (Forbes & Leonard, 1930)
Stigmella heteromelis Newton & Wilkinson, 1982
Stigmella inconspicuella Newton & Wilkinson, 1982
Stigmella intermedia (Braun, 1917)
Stigmella juglandifoliella (Clemens, 1861)
Stigmella latifasciella (Chambers, 1878)
Stigmella longisacca Newton & Wilkinson, 1982
Stigmella maya Stonis, Remeikis, Diskus and Noreika, 2013
Stigmella myricafoliella (Busck, 1900)
Stigmella nigriverticella (Chambers, 1875)
Stigmella ostryaefoliella (Clemens, 1861)
Stigmella pallida (Braun, 1912)
Stigmella plumosetaeella Newton & Wilkinson, 1982
Stigmella pomivorella (Packard, 1870)
Stigmella populetorum (Frey & Boll, 1878)
Stigmella procrastinella (Braun, 1927)
Stigmella prunifoliella (Clemens, 1861)
Stigmella purpuratella (Braun, 1917)
Stigmella quercipulchella (Chambers, 1878)
Stigmella racemifera Šimkevičiūtė & Stonis, 2009
Stigmella resplendensella (Chambers, 1875)
Stigmella rhamnicola (Braun, 1916)
Stigmella rhoifoliella (Braun, 1912)
Stigmella rosaefoliella (Clemens, 1861)
Stigmella saginella (Clemens, 1861)
Stigmella scinanella Wilkinson & Scoble, 1979
Stigmella scintillans (Braun, 1917)
Stigmella sclerostyla Newton & Wilkinson, 1982
Stigmella slingerlandella (Kearfott, 1908)
Stigmella stigmaciella Wilkinson & Scoble, 1979
Stigmella taeniola (Braun, 1925)
Stigmella tiliella (Braun, 1912)
Stigmella unifasciella (Chambers, 1875)
Stigmella variella (Braun, 1910)
Stigmella villosella (Clemens, 1861)

The following species are found in South and Central America, but not in North America:

Stigmella albilamina Puplesis & Robinson, 2000
Stigmella andina (Meyrick, 1915)
Stigmella austroamericana Puplesis & Diškus, 2002
Stigmella barbata Puplesis & Robinson, 2000
Stigmella costalimai (Bourquin, 1962)
Stigmella cuprata (Meyrick, 1915)
Stigmella epicosma (Meyrick, 1915)
Stigmella eurydesma (Meyrick, 1915)
Stigmella fuscilamina Puplesis & Robinson, 2000
Stigmella guittonae (Bourquin, 1962)
Stigmella hamata Puplesis & Robinson, 2000
Stigmella hylomaga (Meyrick, 1931)
Stigmella imperatoria Puplesis & Robinson, 2000
Stigmella johannis (Zeller, 1877)
Stigmella kimae Puplesis & Robinson, 2000
Stigmella marmorea Puplesis & Robinson, 2000
Stigmella montanotropica Puplesis & Diškus, 2002
Stigmella nubimontana Puplesis & Diškus, 2002
Stigmella olyritis (Meyrick, 1915)
Stigmella ovata Puplesis & Robinson, 2000
Stigmella peruanica Puplesis & Robinson, 2000
Stigmella pruinosa Puplesis & Robinson, 2000
Stigmella rubeta Puplesis & Diškus, 2002
Stigmella rudis Puplesis & Robinson, 2000
Stigmella schoorli Puplesis & Robinson, 2000

References

External links
Fauna Europaea
 With images.

The Nepticuloidea and Tisherioidea: Strategic Regional Revisions with a Global Review
Stigmella at the Australian Faunal Directory

Monotrysia genera
Nepticulidae
Taxa named by Franz von Paula Schrank